Leo III, Leon III, or Levon III may refer to:

 People
 Leo III the Isaurian (685-741), Byzantine emperor 717-741
 Pope Leo III (d. 816), Pope 795-816
 Leon III of Abkhazia, King of Abkhazia 960–969
 Leo II, King of Armenia (c. 1236–1289), sometimes referred to as Leo III, ruled from 1269 to 1289.
 Leo III, King of Armenia (1287-1307), ruled from 1303 to 1307

 Other uses
Leo A, an irregular galaxy in the constellation of Leo
The Oath of Leo III, 16th-century painting about the 9th century Pope Leo III
LEO III (computer), an early computer used for commercial business applications

tr:III. Leo